Pleasure Ridge Park High School is a public secondary school in the Pleasure Ridge Park neighborhood of Louisville, Kentucky. It is part of the Jefferson County Public Schools (Kentucky) district. It is next to Greenwood Road Elementary School and Valley Sports Little League.

The campus consists of five buildings: the Main Building, the Tech Building, the Large Gym, the E-Building, and the Fine Arts Auditorium. The main building consists of the Small Gym, the ITV room, the cafeteria, the library, two computer labs, the main office, and the counselor's office. The tech building consists of a computer lab, the weight room, and the seminar room.

Beginning in the 2017–18 school year, The JCPS Academies of Louisville at Pleasure Ridge Park began to rotate students throughout Pathway electives to gain exposure to programs prior to declaring a major. Then, at the end of their freshman year, students can choose a Pathway to follow for the rest of their high school career and possibly gain certification in their field of study.

The Pathways include the Academies of Business and Communication, Medical Sciences, and Engineering/Manufacturing/Design.

Notable alumni

 Zack Cox, minor league baseball player
 Scott Downs, former Major League baseball player
 Brandon Dunn, NFL defensive end
 Andrew Horne, politician, attorney and retired U.S. Marine Corps Reserves Lieutenant Colonel 
 Taywan Taylor, NFL wide receiver for the Cleveland Browns
 Michael Wines, journalist
 Michael Anthony King, singer-songwriter and retired USBC League bowler player

See also
 List of public schools in Louisville, Kentucky

References

External links
 

Jefferson County Public Schools (Kentucky)
Educational institutions established in 1958
Public high schools in Kentucky
1958 establishments in Kentucky
Magnet schools in Kentucky
High schools in Louisville, Kentucky